The 2004–05 Divizia A was the eighty-seventh season of Divizia A, the top-level football league of Romania. Season began in July 2004 and ended in June 2005. Steaua București became champions on 11 June 2005.

Team changes

Relegated
The teams that were relegated to the Divizia B at the end of the previous season:
 Ceahlăul Piatra Neamț
 Petrolul Ploiești
 Bihor Oradea

Promoted
The teams that were promoted from the Divizia B at the start of the season:
 Politehnica Iași
 Sportul Studențesc
 CFR Cluj

Venues

Personnel and kits

League table

Positions by round

Results

Attendances

Top goalscorers

Champion squad

References

Liga I seasons
Romania
1